American Feud:  A History of Conservatives and Liberals is a 2017 documentary originally released in 2008 by Richard Hall and Simone Fary.  The documentary takes a non partisan look at the history of liberalism and conservatism in the United States since the 1890s progressive era.

Synopsis
Participants in the documentary argue that modern liberalism began as a result of 19th century industrialism and as a reaction against the negative aspects of the new condition. Modern conservatism is said to begin as an argument against the New Deal of Franklin Roosevelt, and it slowly grew after World War II, as it opposed the expanding role of the federal government.

The political and intellectual history of modern liberalism and modern conservatism are presented in the revised 2017 edition leading up to the election of Donald Trump. Modern conservatism became a national political movement through the failed 1964 presidential candidacy of Republican Senator Barry Goldwater, and modern liberalism reached a peak but began to decline with the perceived failure of the Great Society programs and the prolonged Vietnam War under president Lyndon Johnson.

The opinions of scholars, authors, historians, and partisan activists from left, right and center are presented. Archival film, photographs and electoral maps help to trace the history, influence and shifting meaning of these two terms over the past 120 years. It also makes a critical evaluation of the concept of "red states" and "blue states".

The 2017 re-release includes a 2015 interview with American Enterprise Institute scholar Norman Ornstein, who argues that congressional politics have become increasingly dysfunctional since the rise of former House Speaker Newt Gingrich, and the "conservative" argument that much of government is bad. Ornstein also argues that the two political parties are becoming racially divided.

Participants 

 Noam Chomsky
 Norman Ornstein
 G. Gordon Liddy
 Howard Zinn
 Thomas Frank
 Kevin Phillips
 Michael Barone
 David Boaz
 Michael Kazin 
 Mona Charen
 Lee Edwards
 Donna Brazile
 Adrian Woolridge
 David Stoesz

References

Festivals
 Philadelphia Independent Film Festival
 Twin Rivers Media Festival
 Independents Film Festival
 Utopia Film Festival
 Takoma Park Film Festival

External links
 Official Film Website
 Trailer 2017 Edition

2008 films
Documentary films about American politics
2000s American films